Andy Bruce (born  in Edinburgh) is a Scottish former professional football player who is best known for his time with Rangers.

Bruce began his professional career with Rangers, having played previously with junior outfit Linlithgow Rose F.C. Whilst at Ibrox he made two appearances and had a loan spell at Partick Thistle. He joined Heart of Midlothian in 1986 and spent one season there, making one appearance in the league and one in the East of Scotland Shield. He also had a brief loan spell at Greenock Morton whilst at Tynecastle. He retired from professional football upon his release from Hearts in 1987.

References

External links

1964 births
Living people
Rangers F.C. players
Association football goalkeepers
Heart of Midlothian F.C. players
Partick Thistle F.C. players
Scottish footballers
Scottish Junior Football Association players
Greenock Morton F.C. players
Footballers from Edinburgh
Scottish Football League players
Linlithgow Rose F.C. players